Ōjin Seamount, also called Ōjin Guyot, named after Emperor Ōjin, 15th Emperor of Japan, is a guyot of the Hawaiian-Emperor seamount chain in the Pacific Ocean. It erupted 55 million years ago.

See also
List of volcanoes in the Hawaiian – Emperor seamount chain

References

Bibliography

Hawaiian–Emperor seamount chain
Guyots
Hotspot volcanoes
Seamounts of the Pacific Ocean
Eocene volcanoes
Paleogene Oceania